The Minnesota Transportation Museum (MTM, reporting mark MNTX) is a transportation museum in Saint Paul, Minnesota, United States.

MTM operates several heritage transportation sites in Minnesota and one in Wisconsin. The museum is actively involved in preserving local railroad, bus and streetcar history.

MTM was formed in 1962 to save a streetcar that had been built and operated by Twin City Rapid Transit (TCRT) in Minneapolis–St. Paul.  Many of the museum's early members were formerly part of the Minnesota Railfans Association, which had organized railfan trips from the 1940s to the 1960s.

In 2004–2005, the organization's streetcar operations became the Minnesota Streetcar Museum, with the steamboat Minnehaha, originally built by TCRT in a style similar to its streetcars, becoming a major attraction of the Museum of Lake Minnetonka.

Minnehaha Depot 

After the first streetcar, TCRT  1300, was successfully restored, other projects were examined in the time before the streetcar could be put on its own set of rails.

The Minnehaha Depot was a former Milwaukee Road depot at Minnehaha Falls. The station, built in 1875, was nicknamed "The Princess" because of its delicate architecture.  The depot is a contributing property to the Minnehaha Historic District. Trains running on special routes have sometimes stopped at the station, and it was eventually integrated into the area streetcar system.  Tracks owned by the Canadian Pacific Railway reach the station, though it is at the disused end of a rail spur.

The depot is owned by the Minnesota Historical Society and operated by the Minnesota Transportation Museum. In 1967, the depot became the first building to be restored by the museum and it was outfitted with exhibits. In 2004, the METRO Blue Line's Minnehaha Park station opened across the road from the old depot.

Classic buses

Up until 2019, Several buses from the 1940s and 1950s were also operated by the museum. Most equipment in the bus collection were built by the GMC division of General Motors, and represented the vehicles that replaced the streetcars in the Twin Cities in the 1950s. The conversion from a streetcar to bus system required two years. The last trolley run was on Hennepin Avenue on June 18, 1954.

The collection consisted of buses that once operated in and across Minnesota. The Earliest is a 1942 Mack (occasionally used in conjunction with the Commemorative Air Force) which transported war workers to the B-24 final assembly point at what is now St Paul's Holman Field, and a block of 1953/54 GMC transit units, two of which are painted in original Twin Cities Lines colors. The buses were used in regular charter service, and once formed a very visible part of the museum's collection, often used in wedding and corporate charters, and on the museum's city tours.

This part of the collection was sponsored by Richfield Bus Company, who had provided maintenance and licensing to operate them.

As the museum acquired much of its bus collection from Metro Transit, the bus company sometimes requests the use of the old buses for special events.

In 2019, The entire bus collection was donated to a private party. The museum currently has no plans on acquiring new buses to replace their former collection.

Osceola and St. Croix Valley Railway
MTM, in conjunction with the Historical Society of Osceola, Wisconsin, operates a heritage railroad called the Osceola and St. Croix Valley Railway.  Excursion trains are operated on trackage formerly owned by Wisconsin Central Ltd., now part of Canadian National Railway.

Excursion trains operate from the historic Osceola Depot, north to Dresser, Wisconsin, and southbound to and through the scenic St. Croix River Valley. Regular schedules begin on the first weekend in May, continuing through the last week of October. Special Event trains operate through the season, including Wine Tasting, the Pumpkin Train (Halloween) and Fall Leaf Viewing trains through the River Valley.

At the Osceola service area, several locomotives and pieces of rolling stock are on display. All equipment has been reconditioned to standard operating condition, including classic 1920s open-window coaches, Great Northern express coaches and a refreshment car (Baggage car 265). Locomotives currently in running condition are classic diesel-electric.

In past years the classic steam engine, Northern Pacific No. 328 (4-6-0) was used to pull the trains, but has been placed in restoration status due to its age (107 yrs).

The regular service train route runs approximately 50 minutes to/from Dresser, Wisconsin, and 100 minutes to/from Marine on St. Croix, Minnesota.

The Museum also operates the Dresser Depot at the northeast terminus of the line in Dresser, WI. The Depot has been preserved exactly as if the staff stepped out for a break, down to calendars and railroad notices. It is also the site of Pumpkin Train Park, hosting several thousand visitors during the pre-Halloween weekend.

Jackson Street Roundhouse

The Jackson Street Roundhouse is MTM headquarters in St. Paul, as well as a fully functional railroad roundhouse, one of the last of its kind in the country. During winter months, the Roundhouse is a functioning work area for Museum rolling stock, often with the volunteer workforce welding, grinding and sending sparks flying.

Open Wednesday & Saturday, year-round, and on Friday during the summer months it is a maintenance & restorations base for the museum's locomotives and rolling stock.  It is highly interactive, offering train rides (Saturdays) as well as hands-on exhibits about surface transportation history of Minnesota and the upper Midwest.

The building was erected by the Great Northern Railway in 1907, replacing another, older roundhouse. The site has been used for rail transportation since the first railroad came to Minnesota (1860s). The Roundhouse and surrounding grounds are a near complete display of American industrial history from the 19th century through the mid-20th century.

The Roundhouse is base for equipment as varied as Pullman coaches, Northern Pacific RR mail & baggage cars, an operating  turntable, a 200-ton lifting crane, an F7A Freight engine (under long term restoration to operating status), a Brill Car (one of the last of its kind) and the Minnesota Transportation Museum's fleet of classic buses.

The roundhouse is also home to the famous Northern Pacific Railway steam engine No. 2156, known to many Twin Cities Gen X children as Casey Jones's steam engine, from the popular children's program "Lunch With Casey" starring Roger Awsumb as Casey Jones, in the 60's & 70's. No. 2156, having been torn down for restoration for the last decade, is undergoing stabilization to become part of a "Steam Bay" exhibit, demonstrating the inner workings of steam locomotives. It will be displayed next to its sister engine No. 2153, restored cosmetically to original operating configuration.

Train Equipment

Steam Locomotives

Diesel Locomotives

Passenger Cars

Cabooses
 Burlington Northern #11214
 Chicago, Burlington & Quincy #13500
 Great Northern #X71
 Milwaukee Road #992040
 Northern Pacific #1264
 Northern Pacific #1631
 Soo Line #31

Service & miscellaneous equipment
 Great Northern #X1735 Derrick Wrecking Crane
 Northern Pacific #30 Russel Snow Plow

References

External links

Minnesota Transportation Museum
Minnesota Historical Society: Minnehaha Depot

Automobile museums in Minnesota
Bus museums
Minnesota state historic sites
Museums in Saint Paul, Minnesota
Railroad museums in Minnesota
Railroad roundhouses in Minnesota